The Frazer (1946–1951) was the flagship line of upper-medium priced American luxury automobiles built by the Kaiser-Frazer Corporation of Willow Run Ypsilanti, Michigan, and was, with Crosley, the first American car with new envelope body and fresh postwar styling.

Named for longtime American automobile executive Joseph W. Frazer who had become president and general manager of Kaiser-Frazer, the Frazer was styled by Howard "Dutch" Darrin with some input from other K-F stylists. The new Frazer won the Fashion Academy of New York Gold Medal for design achievement. Production began on May 29, 1946 and the Frazer made its public debut June 29, 1946. There was one basic four-door sedan body shell that was shared with the similar but lower-priced (by $200 to $600) Kaiser. The Frazer used the Continental Red Seal 226 CID "Supersonic" L-head six powerplant which reached  by the end of Frazer production at the conclusion of the 1951 model year. The luxury line Frazer Manhattan Series F47C was introduced on March 23, 1947 at a $500 premium over the original Frazer Series F-47, which continued on as the Standard. By 1948, Frazer sales totaled about 1.5% of all American cars built.

The dramatically-restyled 1951 Frazer models included a four-door convertible, a hardtop sedan, and the Frazer Vagabond, a unique hatchback sedan. The final Frazers—which were actually facelifted leftover 1950 models—were introduced in March 1950 and were an immediate hit with the public. Over 50,000 orders were placed, but at that point Joseph W. Frazer had left the company and K-F management decided to concentrate only on Kaiser production after building 10,214 of the 1951 Frazer, when the supply of leftover 1950 bodies ran out. A trivial, but to car buffs significant, aspect of the Frazer was that its four doors had push-button openers. This feature was shared at the time only by such cars as the Lincoln. Both Henry Kaiser and Joseph Frazer were convinced by evidence that the existing automobile manufacturers centered on Detroit had combined to shut off the supplies of materials and parts necessary to the success of the new automotive company.

See also
 List of defunct United States automobile manufacturers

References

External links
Kaiser Frazer Owners Club International

Kaiser Motors
Kaiser vehicles
Cars introduced in 1946
1950s cars